The Mernda railway line (previously the South Morang line, Epping line and Whittlesea line) is a commuter rail passenger train service in Melbourne, Australia. It operates between Flinders Street in the Melbourne central business district and Mernda through the northern suburbs including East Melbourne, Richmond, Abbotsford, Clifton Hill, Fitzroy North, Northcote, Preston, Reservoir, Thomastown, Lalor, Epping, South Morang and Mernda. The service is part of the Public Transport Victoria metropolitan rail network.

Services on the line began in 1889 when the section between North Fitzroy (on the now closed Inner Circle line) and Reservoir was opened, which was extended to Whittlesea in the same year. The line was however closed beyond Lalor in November 1959, while the remainder of the line was electrified. The closed section has since been gradually reconstructed and reopened: to Epping in 1964, South Morang in 2012, and to Mernda in August 2018.

Services usually operate every 20 minutes during the day and 30 minutes at night in both directions, stopping at all stations. All citybound services operate direct to Flinders Street, then outbound via the City Loop (except early weekend morning services which operate direct to Jolimont).

Description
The Mernda line travels almost due north, traversing gently rising land. It has few curves, few significant grades, and little in the way of earthworks, other than a cutting near Northcote. It has numerous level crossings, and only a few bridges over or under roads. Despite the otherwise fairly straight line, it does include Melbourne's sharpest railway curve, between Rushall and Merri. This curve originally made up the third side of a triangular junction, connecting the two original branches from the now-closed North Fitzroy station. Only this third leg of the triangle remains. The entire line runs through built-up areas of Melbourne's northern suburbs.

Following the late 2011 Epping line works, all stations along the Mernda line, excluding the City Loop, have two platforms, one for each direction. This includes all stations along the section between Clifton Hill and Jolimont, which is shared with the Hurstbridge line.

Infrastructure
The line is double track to Mernda (while at Clifton Hill the Hurstbridge Line branches off). The line is controlled by automatic block signalling (ABS) up to Mernda. There are intermediate terminating facilities at Clifton Hill, Bell, Reservoir, Keon Park, Epping and South Morang. Stabling facilities are provided at Epping (which is also the location of a repair centre) and at Mernda.

History

Opening
The beginnings of the Mernda line was opened on 8 October 1889, as part of railway extensions into the northern suburbs. What became known as the Inner Circle line was opened from Spencer Street station (now Southern Cross station) via Royal Park station, to a station called Collingwood (now called Victoria Park), and then on to Heidelberg. The Epping line branched off at Fitzroy North to Preston Reservoir station (later renamed Reservoir) in 1889, with the line extended to Whittlesea a few months later, on 23 December.

Trains on the line operated via Fitzroy and the Inner Circle, until the opening of the current connection between Victoria Park and Princes Bridge stations in 1901. Passenger services were operated in two tiers: a local train to Preston Reservoir station via Clifton Hill, and a country mixed train to Whittlesea, via Fitzroy. The Epping line was electrified to Reservoir in 1921, with an AEC railmotor providing a shuttle service between Reservoir and the terminus at Whittlesea. Preston Reservoir station was renamed Reservoir in 1909.

The line had a number of Rail Motor Stopping Places along the line, these being a mere nameboard beside the railway line at a convenient public access point. The first were RMSP 8, 9 and 10, which opened on 10 May 1927; followed by Epping Quarries Siding RMSP in January 1928; RMSP 17 in March 1928; RMSP 26 in January 1930; RMSP 33 in July 1932; RMSP 39 in July 1941; and RMSP 77 in October 1949, which was renamed Lalor station in 1952. Direct Whittlesea trains from Flinders Street and Spencer Street were withdrawn from 1948.

Electrification and reduction
Electrification was extended along  of single track to Thomastown in 1929, paid for by a land developer, who paid for the works, as well as guaranteeing against operating losses. Keon Park station was opened at the same time, but the Whittlesea shuttle train continued to connect with suburban trains at Reservoir, until 1931. From this time, a double-ended Leyland railmotor was provided, and connections made at Thomastown. Goods trains to Whittlesea were withdrawn in 1955, and goods trains from Epping ended in 1958.

Electric suburban services were extended to Lalor station in November 1959, in addition to duplication of the line from Reservoir to Keon Park, with services beyond this point to Whittlesea replaced by bus service, and the line closed. The line to Epping itself was reopened and electrified in 1964, with the remaining line dismantled in the 1970s. However, the right-of-way beyond Mernda is still in place, and is retained for a future railway extension.

Extensions
Proposals for the duplication of the line between Keon Park and Epping and an extension to Mernda have dated as far back as 1974. In 1983, Whittlesea Council submitted a submission to the Victorian Government, supporting the duplication of the line, and examining an extension to South Morang, and Mernda.

Following the election of the Bracks Government in 1999, a promise was made to restore the service to South Morang, along the former right-of-way by 2003, however no work started at that time. In 2003, a Trainlink bus service was introduced from Epping to South Morang, meeting every train, but the 2005 Meeting Our Transport Challenges plan postponed construction of the railway, until 2021. The restoration of the railway to Mernda is also identified in the Strategic Transportation Study, undertaken by the City of Whittlesea in 2002. In the 2008 State Budget, A$10 million was earmarked for design work on the four kilometre extension, in addition to design work for duplication between Keon Park and Epping stations.

South Morang extension

On 1 May 2009, the State Government announced that they had committed $562.3 million in the 2009 State Budget, for the extension of the line to South Morang, covering capital and construction works. The announcement said that tenders would be called later that year, with construction to start in 2010 and be completed by 2013. No level crossings exist on the new section of track, with road overpasses provided at Cooper Street, Pindari Avenue and Civic Drive. The new South Morang station has parking for 450 cars.

Major construction on the extension of the Epping railway line commenced in October 2010. The South Morang Rail Extension Project involved  of rail track duplication, between Keon Park and Epping, a rebuilt Thomastown station, with a second platform and a pedestrian overpass, upgrade and expansion of the Epping train maintenance facility, including new stabling roads, relocation of the existing Epping railway station to the north of Cooper Street,  of new double rail tracks from Epping to South Morang, and a new railway station at South Morang. The double track between Keon Park and Epping was commissioned on 28 November 2011.

A shared use path was opened to the public on 5 February 2012. The three-metre wide path runs the length of the rail extension and provides connections between the existing bicycle network, through to South Morang railway station.

Mernda extension
The 2015 State Budget allocated $9 million to plan the  extension of the line to Mernda, with building commencing in 2016. The extension is double track and completely grade separated, initially with two stations. Mernda station was located on the south side of Bridge Inn Road, integrated with the future Mernda Town Centre shopping centre, south of location of the original station. A second station, Middle Gorge, (originally named Marymede during construction) was selected following community consultation. 

In November 2016, the government announced that a third station called Hawkstowe would be built near Hawkstowe Parade in South Morang as part of the extension.

Waste management contractor Haulaway worked with a social enterprise, Outlook Environmental, to offer support and employment opportunities to socially disadvantaged members of the local community as part of this project.

The  Mernda extension opened on 26 August 2018.

Extension proposals

Wollert line
A proposal exists for a spur line to be constructed to Epping North, and the suburb of Wollert, at a cost of between A$76 million and A$300 million. The line would branch off the Mernda line at Lalor, with new stations at Epping Plaza, Epping North, Aurora and Wollert. A number of properties to reserve the Wollert rail corridor have been purchased by the State Government. 

The Metropolitan Planning Authority proposes for this line to have its terminus in Wollert.

Services 
Outbound services stop all stations from Flinders Street to Mernda, with the exception of some services during weekday morning peaks. During this time, some services will run express from Jolimont, stopping only at Clifton Hill, Preston, Reservoir, Thomastown, Epping, South Morang and Mernda. Some of these AM express services terminate at either Reservoir or Epping. Two outbound all-stations services terminate at South Morang during this time.

All citybound services stop at all stations seven days a week. One weekday afternoon pre-peak service originates from Epping, with another originating at South Morang.

All services on the Mernda line run clockwise through the City Loop, except weekend early morning services and Night Network services running direct to and from Flinders Street.

Services run every 6-8 minutes during peak times and every 20 minutes during off peak times and weekends. Services run every 60 minutes for Night Network and every 40 minutes during Sunday mornings.

City Loop 
Almost all Mernda citybound and outbound services operate through the City Loop. Trains run direct to Flinders Street from Jolimont and clockwise through the loop. This does not include night services.

References

Further reading

External links
 Statistics and detailed schematic map at the VicSig enthusiast website

Railway lines in Melbourne
Railway lines opened in 1889
5 ft 3 in gauge railways in Australia
1901 establishments in Australia
Transport in the City of Darebin
Transport in the City of Whittlesea
Public transport routes in the City of Melbourne (LGA)
Transport in the City of Yarra